Scraps of Time: 1879, Away West is a 2006 book by Patricia McKissack about a farmboy, Everett Turner, who runs away and joins the Exodusters, travelling to Nicodemus, Kansas.

Reception
Away West has been reviewed by a number of journals including Booklist and the School Library Journal, that recommended it for  developing readers, and Kirkus Reviews. It has been on school reading lists.

References

2006 American novels
2006 children's books
American children's novels
Children's historical novels
American historical novels
Books by Patricia McKissack
Novels set in the historical United States
Fiction set in 1879